The 5th General Assembly of Nova Scotia represented Nova Scotia between May 1770 to 1784, its membership being set in the 1770 Nova Scotia general election.

The 5th General Assembly is known as Nova Scotia's "Long Parliament"  as it sat for fourteen years, throughout the length of the rebellion of the thirteen colonies. William Nesbitt was chosen as speaker in 1770. Thomas Cochran became speaker in 1784 after Nesbitt's death.

A writ for the election of the 5th General Assembly of Nova Scotia was issued on 18 April 1770.  The assembly convened on 6 June 1770, held seventeen sessions, and was dissolved on 20 October 1785.

It is known as the "Long Parliament" as it sat for fifteen years, throughout the length of the rebellion of the thirteen colonies.

Due to the extreme length of this assembly, there were a very large number of seats declared vacant and by-elections.  The house journal sometimes makes note of the circumstances, oftentimes coloured by political rhetoric of the time.

Sessions
Dates of specific sessions are under research.

Governor and Council
According to Allison, page 481, in 1774, the composition of His Majesties government in Nova Scotia was:

Governor: Lord William Campbell -absent 30 October 1771 – 13 July 1772.
Lieutenant Governor: Michael Francklin -absent 30 October 1771 – 30 June 1772, served as acting governor 30 June 1772 – 13 July 1772 during the absence of Gov. Campbell.
Administrator: Benjamin Green -served as acting governor 30 October 1771 – 30 June 1772 during the absence of both Gov. Campbell and Lt. Gov. Francklin.
Governor: Francis Legge -named 8 October 1773.
Lieutenant Governor:
Michael Francklin -confirmed
Mariot Arbuthnot -named 27 April 1776
Sir Richard Hughes -named 17 August 1778
Sir Andrew Snape Hamond -named 31 July 1781
Governor: John Parr -named 9 October 1782
Lieutenant Governor:
Sir Andrew Snape Hamond -confirmed
Edmund Fanning -named 23 September 1783

Note: this data is preliminary and is a work in progress.  Many editors have gotten confused about the role of the Lt. Governor, and acting governor.  They are not the same.  Most but not all acting governors were Lt. Governors, and most but not all Lt. Governors served as acting governors for part or all of their terms.  This section is subject to further research.

The members of the Council are currently under research.

The information below comes from an earlier version of this article and has not been verified:

House of Assembly

Officers
Speaker of the House:
William Nesbitt of Halifax County -retired 7 November 1783.
Henry Denny Denson of Kings County -speaker pro tern from 20 October 1773 to 12 November 1773 (5th Session) during Nesbitt's illness.
Thomas Cochran of Liverpool Township -elected 1 November 1784.
Clerk of the House:
Isaac Deschamps of Newport Township -appointed to Council
Richard Cunningham of Londonderry Township -elected 6 October 1783.

Division of seats
As in previous assemblies, there were 4 seats assigned to Halifax County, 2 seats to the other counties and to Halifax Township, and 1 seat to the other townships.  There were 33 seats at the beginning of the assembly.  During the assembly, Amherst and Windsor Townships, and Hants County were added, for a total of 37 seats.

Members
Amherst Township
William Freeman -initial by-election 1783, took seat 22 October 1783.
Annapolis County
Phineas Lovett, Sr. -seat declared vacant 10 December 1774, for non-attendance.
Joseph Patten -seat declared vacant 10 December 1774, for non-attendance.
William Shaw -by-election, took seat 12 June 1775, seat declared vacant 29 November 1784 for contempt of House (refusing to attend and produce public accounts)
John Hall -by-election, took seat 17 June 1775, seat declared vacant 28 June 1776 for non-attendance.
Henry Evans -by-election, return 20 August 1776, seat declared vacant 4 July 1782 for non-attendance, died 2 November 1782.
John Ritchie -by-election, took seat 8 October 1783
Annapolis Township
Obadiah Wheelock -seat declared vacant 10 December 1774 for non-attendance.
Phineas Lovett, Jr. -by-election, took seat 12 June 1775, seat declared vacant 26 November 1783 for non-attendance.
Stephen Delancey -by-election, took seat 16 November 1784
Barrington Township
Richard Gibbons -election declared invalid 19 June 1771.
John Fillis -by-election, took seat 11 June 1772
Cornwallis Township
Samuel Willoughby -suspended 21 October 1774, to 8 December 1774, pending trial for usury. Seat declared vacant 28 June 1776 for non-attendance.
John Chipman -by-election, 14 August 1776, took seat 10 June 1777.
Cumberland County
John Huston -seat declared vacant 10 December 1774 for non-attendance
William Scurr -by-election, took seat 12 June 1775, seat declared vacant 28 June 1776 for non-attendance.
Thomas Dickson -by-election 20 August 1776, took seat 20 June 1777, not in attendance 1783.
Joshua Winslow -seat declared vacant 8 July 1772 for non-attendance.
Jotham Gay -by-election 23 September 1772, seat declared vacant 10 December 1774 for non-attendance. Reelected, took seat 12 June 1775.
Cumberland Township
Jonathan Eddy -seat declared vacant 20 July 1775 for non-attendance "afterwards turned Rebble"
John Allan -by-election, took seat 30 October 1775, seat declared vacant 28 June 1776 for non-attendance.
Hezekiah King -by-election 21 August 1776, seat declared vacant 4 July 1782.  House journal states "The member elected several years ago has never attended."
Martin Gay -by-election, took seat 14 October 1783
Falmouth Township
Isaac Deschamps -elected for both Falmouth and Newport Townships, gave up this seat.
Edward York -by-election, took seat 17 June 1771, seat declared vacant 20 July 1775 for non-attendance.
Jeremiah Northup -by-election, took seat 24 October 1775.
Granville Township
John Harris -died spring 1772.
Christopher Prince -by-election, took seat 2 July 1772.
Halifax County
John Butler -appointed to Council 20 November 1772.
John Philipps -by-election, writ issued 16 February 1773, took seat 20 April 1773.
Robert Campbell -died 3 January 1775.
James Brenton -by-election, writ issued 26 February 1776, took seat 15 June 1776.
William Nesbitt -retired 7 November 1783, with pension of £100 per annum.
William Abbott -by-election, took seat 1 November 1784.
John Newton -seat declared vacant 8 July 1772 for non-attendance.
William Howard South -by-election, writ issued 14 July 1772, took seat 20 April 1773, died September 1777.
James Browne -by-election, took seat 6 June 1778, left the province.
John George Pyke -by-election, took seat 7 June 1779.
Halifax Township
Thomas Bridge -attended, left province spring or summer 1781.
Benjamin Green, Jr. -by-election 28 February 1782, took seat 11 June 1782.
Charles Procter -died 21 December 1773.
John Day -by-election 25 August 1774, took seat 6 October 1774, died at sea 1775/6.
Joseph Fairbanks -by-election, return 20 April 1776, took seat 15 June 1776.
Hants County
George Brightman -initial by-election, writ 4 July 1782, took seat 6 October 1783.
Benjamin DeWolf -initial by-election, writ July 1782, took seat 7 October 1783.
Horton Township
Charles Dickson -seat declared vacant 28 June 1776 due to illness.
Joseph Pierce -by-election, return 19 August 1776, took seat 16 June 1777, resigned 25 June 1778 due to age.
Thomas Caldwell -by-election, return 28 January 1779, took seat 9 June 1779.
Kings County
Henry Denny Denson -died 9 May 1780.
John Whidden -by-election, took seat 26 October 1780.
Winckworth Tonge -seat declared vacant 26 November 1783 for non-attendance.
Jonathan Crane -by-election, took seat 17 November 1784.
Liverpool Township
John Doggett -died 20 March 1772.
Samuel Doggett -by-election, 26 May 1772, sailed for West Indies 14 June 1772, seat reported vacant 8 July 1772 and 24 April 1773.
Seth Harding -by-election, 2 July 1773, took seat 12 October 1773, seat declared vacant 10 December 1774 for non-attendance.
Thomas Cochran -by-election, 3 July 1775, took seat 13 July 1775.
Londonderry Township
John Morrison -seat declared vacant 8 July 1772 for non-attendance.  Reelected, writ issued 21 January, returned 20 February 1773, took seat 1 November 1774.  Left for New Hampshire 1777.  House journal on 25 June 1778 reports "member has absconded and is gone out of the province."
John Cunningham -by-election, took seat 7 June 1779.
Lunenburg County
Archibald Hinshelwood -died 26 May 1773.
Otto William Schwartz -by-election 5 November 1773, took seat 6 October 1774.  Died 5 October 1785.
John Creighton -named to Council 6 May 1775.
John Newton -by-election, took seat 24 June 1775.
Lunenberg Township
Philip Augustus Knaut -died 28 December 1781.
Casper Wollenhaupt -by-election, took seat 18 October 1783.
Newport Township
Isaac Deschamps -appointed to Council, seat declared vacant 26 November 1783.
Joshua Sanford -by-election, took seat 1 November 1784.
Onslow Township
Joshua Lamb -seat declared vacant 8 July 1772, 6 October – 10 December 1774 for non-attendance.
Richard Upham -by-election, took seat 12 June 1775.  Apparently died September 1775.
Joshua Lamb -by-election, writ issued 21 November 1775, return 17 February 1776, seat reported vacant 28 June 1776.
Charles Dickson -by-election, writ issued 17 July, return 6 August 1776, seat reported vacant 11 June 1777.  (Elliott notes that in this period, the inhabitants of Onslow were refusing to take the Oath of Allegiance, and the vacancy may have been declared to deny representation.) Seat again declared vacant 4 July 1782 for non-attendance.  Apparently reelected in another by-election, took seat again 27 October 1783.
Queens County
Simeon Perkins -took seat 25 June 1771.
William Smith -died 24 June 1779.
Nathaniel Freeman -by-election, 20 April 1780, seat declared vacant 26 November 1783 for non-attendance.
Benajah Collins -by-election, took seat 17 November 1784.
Sackville Township
Robert Foster -seat declared vacant 8 July 1772 for non-attendance.
Samuel Rogers -by-election, 6 November 1773, took seat 17 July 1775, seat declared vacant 28 June 1776 for non-attendance.
Robert Foster -by-election, writ issued 17 July 1776, return 22 August 1776, seat declared vacant 4 July 1782. House journal reports "member has absconded".
Richard John Uniacke -by-election, took seat 6 October 1783.
Sunbury County -became part of New Brunswick in 1784.
Charles Morris (1731–1802) -took seat 29 June 1770.
Israel Perley -may have never sat, seat reported vacant 8 July 1772.
James Simonds -by-election, 28 June 1773, took seat 20 October 1774, seat declared vacant 4 July 1782 for non-attendance.
William Davidson -by-election, took seat 7 October 1783.
Truro Township
William Fisher -may have never sat, seat declared vacant 8 July 1772 for non-attendance.  Re-elected 4 February 1773, seat again declared vacant 10 December 1774 for non-attendance.
Samuel Archibald -by-election, took seat 12 June 1775, denied seat 13 June 1777.  (The inhabitants of Truro, Onslow and Londonderry were refusing to take the Oath of Allegiance.)
John Harris -by-election, took seat 18 June 1781.
Windsor Township
George Deschamps -initial by-election, took seat 14 June 1782.
Yarmouth Township
Malachy Salter -elected in 1770, took seat 11 June 1772, election declared invalid 2 July 1772.
John Crawley -by-election 3 December 1772, may not have sat, seat declared vacant 10 December 1774 and 12 June 1775 for non-attendance.
James Monk -by-election, took seat 15 June 1775, seat declared vacant 28 June 1776 for non-attendance, went to Quebec.
Richard Cunningham -by-election, 12 April 1779, took seat 9 October 1780, appointed Clerk of the House and seat declared vacant 26 November 1783.

Note:  Unless otherwise noted, members were elected at the general election, and took their seats at the convening of the assembly.  By-elections are special elections held to fill specific vacancies.  When a member is noted as having taking their seat on a certain date, but a by-election isn't noted, the member was elected at the general election but arrived late.

References

Journal and votes of the House of Assembly for the province of Nova Scotia (1770)
 

05
1780 in Canada
1781 in Canada
1782 in Canada
1783 in Canada
1784 in Canada
1770s in Canada
1770 establishments in Nova Scotia
1784 disestablishments in Nova Scotia
1770s in Nova Scotia
1780s in Nova Scotia